Scotland in Union (SIU) is a pro-UK campaign group, based in Scotland, which launched in March 2015 to help keep Scotland within the United Kingdom. Its supporters include members of pro-UK political parties and people with no party affiliation. It is Scotland's largest and most active pro-UK campaign group, with 36,000 signed up supporters.

History 

Scotland in Union launched in March 2015, with the aim of promoting Scotland's place in the UK. The group was created in the wake of the 2014 Scottish independence referendum, in which 55 per cent of the electorate voted against the proposal that Scotland should become an independent country. Scotland in Union is a private company limited by guarantee, registered in Scotland.

The organisation was initially led by its founder Alastair Cameron, a former Army captain. In January 2017, Scottish Labour's former Justice spokesperson Graeme Pearson was announced as Chief Executive. In August 2017, former Labour MP Pamela Nash took over the role.

Campaigns and activities

Online presence
Online, SIU maintains a website (https://www.scotlandinunion.co.uk/), a Facebook page (https://www.facebook.com/scotlandinunion/), a Twitter feed (https://twitter.com/scotlandinunion) and an Instagram account (https://www.instagram.com/scotland_in_union/).  On their website, SIU publishes updates, requests donations and highlights specific campaigns.

Polling
SIU has commissioned opinion polling on Scottish independence on several occasions, with a particular focus on the question of whether people think Scotland should remain part of the United Kingdom or leave the United Kingdom.  In 2021, three political academics carried out a study which demonstrated a statistically significant difference between the Remain / Leave format and the 2014 Yes / No question formulation. Another test of the effect of the question wording was carried out via a YouGov poll in March 2022, in which the sample was split and half were asked the 2014 Yes / No question and half were asked a Remain / Leave question; this poll found a significant difference in support for remaining in the UK, depending on the question asked. The use of this wording has been criticised by SNP depute leader Keith Brown, who said in 2019 that it was "a deliberate bid to confuse independence with Brexit".  The most recent polling using Remain / Leave at the time of writing, which was conducted in September 2022 and December 2022, indicates that 59% of Scots would vote to remain and 41% would vote to leave, once undecideds are removed.

Polling commissioned by SIU has also asked when people think another referendum on Scotland leaving the UK should be held, if at all; and has asked people about priority areas for Scottish politicians. One example of this was a poll in May 2022 which found that only 29% of Scots wanted another referendum before the end of 2023. Another poll in September 2022 found that only 7 per cent of Scots think independence is among the most important issues for the Scottish Government.

Other questions asked in SIU's polling have focused on defence and international affairs. This polling in May 2022 showed that majorities believe that membership of the G7 (79%), NATO (82%) and the UN Security Council (79%) is important. Participants were also asked if the UK should retain its Independent nuclear deterrent, with 58% saying the UK should; while 20% said the UK should not (23% don't know).

Economics-focused campaigns
To coincide with the annual publication of the Government Expenditure and Revenue Scotland figures, known as GERS, SIU introduced a new method to break down the 'UK dividend' from which Scotland benefits, for local communities across Scotland. In addition, SIU's Chief Executive, Pamela Nash, has written articles to highlight the benefits to Scottish public spending which come from sharing across the UK.

SIU has also highlighted the Scottish Government's Export Statistics Scotland publication, to increase awareness of the proportion of Scotland's trade with the rest of the UK and to call for more open acknowledgement of Scotland's trade situation.

2023 spending priorities campaign
In late 2022, after the UK Supreme Court had ruled that the Scottish Parliament does not have the power to legislate for a referendum on Scottish independence, SIU launched a campaign to demonstrate alternative uses for the £20m the SNP administration was still apparently allocating to a referendum in 2023.  After the SNP announced that the £20m was in fact being diverted to the fuel insecurity fund, which was one of the suggestions SIU had made, this change was welcomed by SIU's Chief Executive.

Tactical voting campaigns
SIU's first campaign was to encourage tactical voting against the Scottish National Party during the 2015 UK general election.

SIU also encouraged tactical voting in the 2016 Scottish Parliament election, and in November 2019, SIU launched an online tactical voting guide for Scottish voters in the run up to the 2019 UK general election. This guide suggested which party people should vote for in their constituency if their priority was to stop the SNP.

In the run up to the 2021 Scottish Parliament election, SIU launched its tactical voting campaign for voters whose priority was stopping an SNP majority and another referendum. An SNP majority was stopped, with Sir John Curtice commenting that tactical voting probably played a part in this outcome. According to a Scottish Election Study by academics across the UK, released in May 2022, "significant numbers of people voted for both the Conservatives and Labour as part of efforts to defeat the SNP and strengthen the Union".

Devolved functions campaigns
SIU has run a series of campaigns to highlight poor performance by nationalist administrations.  These have mostly used data obtained via Freedom of Information (Scotland) Act 2002 requests, and have included items covering health and income inequalities and cancer waiting times.

In January 2023, SIU released polling (conducted in December 2022), showing that most people in Scotland think the SNP is performing poorly in its handling of key public services.

Billboards, advertising and print media
SIU has used billboards on several occasions, including in 2016, when SIU paid for a large billboard advert near the SNP conference in Glasgow, urging Nicola Sturgeon to "change the record" on independence and rule out another vote. In 2017 in Aberdeen, again outside the SNP conference, SIU organised an advertising van with the message 'Referendumb' that was unveiled to awaiting press as SNP members gathered for the conference. A billboard campaign was launched again in 2021 in the run up to the 2021 Scottish Parliament election.

In September 2018, SIU launched a 'Yawn' campaign, using newspaper advertisements. This was a campaign aimed at people who are 'tired' of the constant constitutional debate; "SNP politicians are still campaigning for an independence referendum that Scotland does not want. Tired of this?" The campaign gained additional media attention when a Police Scotland Twitter account tweeted in apparent support of the campaign, before deleting their tweet.

Events 

Scotland in Union has held local political and social events, mostly in Scotland, but also in London and online. The events have ranged from talks about Scotland's economy, to Burns Night celebrations and events to mark St Andrew's Day, to a Parliamentary reception in at the House of Commons.  

At various events, across the UK and online, SIU has been joined and supported by politicians from across the main pro-UK parties including Ruth Davidson, Anas Sarwar, Christine Jardine, David Mundell, Andrew Bowie, Mike Rumbles, Martin Whitfield, Beatrice Wishart, Jackie Baillie, Murdo Fraser, Alistair Carmichael, Johann Lamont, Ian Murray,  Alex Cole-Hamilton, Willie Rennie, Wendy Chamberlain, Jamie Stone and Donald Cameron

Finances 

Scotland in Union is funded by donations from supporters. In 2018, doubt was cast on the health of the group's finances when it emerged that the majority of its supporters had not contributed any money. Also in 2018, its accounts showed a drop in the organisation's reserves from £313,000 to £170,000. Scotland in Union's latest accounts, published at Companies House for the year to 30 November 2021, showed reserves of £190,975.

Natalie McGarry accusation and apology 

In 2016, Scottish National Party MP Natalie McGarry apologised and paid compensation, after sending a tweet about the leadership of SIU.  Ms McGarry later described the tweet as 'a serious mistake'. SIU's founder, Alastair Cameron, announced that the compensation money would be distributed to three charities: mental health charity Combat Stress, genocide awareness charity Aegis Trust and children's charity Lumos.

Data theft 

In December 2017, SIU informed the police and the Information Commissioner that SIU had suffered a data theft. Subsequent to this incident, the Electoral Commission carried out an investigation of SIU's donations. Following the investigation, the Electoral Commission said it was “satisfied” that SIU had complied with its requirements.

See also
 2014 Scottish independence referendum
 Unionism in Scotland
 Scottish Labour
 Scottish Conservatives
 Scottish Liberal Democrats
 Better Together

References 

Scottish independence
Unionism in Scotland
Cross-party campaigns
2015 establishments in Scotland
Political advocacy groups in Scotland